ChemPlusChem is a monthly peer-reviewed scientific journal covering chemistry and published by Wiley-VCH on behalf of Chemistry Europe. It was established in 1929 by E. Votoček and J. Heyrovský and renamed in 1939 to Collection tschechischer chemischer Forschungsarbeiten/Collection des travaux chimiques tchèques/Collection of Czech Chemical Communications for one year. Publication was suspended until 1947, when it resumed publication as Collection of Czechoslovak Chemical Communications. It obtained its current name in 2012.

Abstracting and indexing
The journal is abstracted and indexed in:
 Chemical Abstracts Service
 Chemistry Citation Index
 Current Contents/Physical, Chemical & Earth Sciences
 Science Citation Index Expanded
 Scopus

According to the Journal Citation Reports, the journal has a 2021 impact factor of 3.210.

References

External links

Chemistry Europe academic journals
Chemistry journals
Publications established in 1929
English-language journals
Monthly journals
Wiley-VCH academic journals